Leandro Oviedo or José Leandro Oviedo is a district in the Itapúa Department of Paraguay.

Sources 
World Gazeteer: Paraguay – World-Gazetteer.com

References 

Districts of Itapúa Department